Žilina may refer to:

Žilina, a city in Slovakia
Žilina (Kladno District), a municipality and village in the Czech Republic
Žilina, an administrative part of Nový Jičín in the Czech Republic